Shirin Farhad or Shirin Farhaad may refer to:

 A version of the classic Persian story of Khosrow and Shirin
 Shirin Farhad (1931 film), an Indian musical film directed by J.J. Madan, the second Indian film with sound
 Shirin Farhad (1956 film), an Indian romantic drama film directed and produced by Aspi Irani

See also
 Shirin (disambiguation)
 Farad (disambiguation)
 Shirin and Farhad (film), a 1934 Iranian romance film
 Shirin Farhad Ki Toh Nikal Padi, a 2012 Indian romantic comedy film